Symbols of death are the motifs, images and concepts associated with death throughout different cultures, religions and societies.

Images 

Various images are used traditionally to symbolize death; these rank from blunt depictions of cadavers and their parts to more allusive suggestions that time is fleeting and all men are mortals.

The human skull is an obvious and frequent symbol of death, found in many cultures and religious traditions. Human skeletons and sometimes non-human animal skeletons and skulls can also be used as blunt images of death; the traditional figures of the Grim Reaper – a black-hooded skeleton with a scythe – is one use of such symbolism. Within the Grim Reaper itself, the skeleton represents the decayed body whereas the robe symbolizes those worn by religious people conducting funeral services. The skull and crossbones motif (☠) has been used among Europeans as a symbol of both piracy and poison. The skull is also important as it remains the only "recognizable" aspect of a person once they have died.

Decayed cadavers can also be used to depict death; in medieval Europe, they were often featured in artistic depictions of the danse macabre, or in cadaver tombs which depicted the living and decomposed body of the person entombed. Coffins also serve as blunt reminders of mortality. Europeans were also seen to use coffins and cemeteries to symbolize the wealth and status of the person who has died, serving as a reminder to the living and the deceased as well.
Less blunt symbols of death frequently allude to the passage of time and the fragility of life, and can be described as memento mori; that is, an artistic or symbolic reminder of the inevitability of death. Clocks, hourglasses, sundials, and other timepieces both call to mind that time is passing. Similarly, a candle both marks the passage of time, and bears witness that it will eventually burn itself out as well as a symbol of hope of salvation. These sorts of symbols were often incorporated into vanitas paintings, a variety of early still life.

Certain animals such as crows, cats, owls, moths, vultures and bats are associated with death; some because they feed on carrion, others because they are nocturnal. Along with death, vultures can also represent transformation and renewal.

Religious symbols 

Religious symbols of death and depictions of the afterlife will vary with the religion practiced by the people who use them.

Tombs, tombstones, and other items of funeral architecture are obvious candidates for symbols of death. In ancient Egypt, the gods Osiris and Ptah were typically depicted as mummies; these gods governed the Egyptian afterlife. In Christianity, the Christian cross is frequently used on graves, and is meant to call to mind the crucifixion of Jesus. Some Christians also erect temporary crosses along public highways as memorials for those who died in accidents. In Buddhism, the symbol of a wheel represents the perpetual cycle of death and rebirth that happens in samsara. The symbol of a grave or tomb, especially one in a picturesque or unusual location, can be used to represent death, as in Nicolas Poussin's famous painting Et in Arcadia ego.

Images of life in the afterlife are also symbols of death. Here, again, the ancient Egyptians produced detailed pictorial representations of the life enjoyed by the dead. In Christian folk religion, the spirits of the dead are often depicted as winged angels or angel-like creatures, dwelling among the clouds; this imagery of the afterlife is frequently used in comic depictions of the life after death. In the Islamic view of the Afterlife, death is symbolised by a black and white ram which in turn will be slain to symbolise the Death of Death.

The Banshee also symbolizes the coming of death in Irish Mythology. This is typically represented by an older woman who is seen sobbing to symbolize the suffering of a person before their death.

Colors 

Black is the color of mourning in many European cultures. Black clothing is typically worn at funerals to show mourning for the death of the person. In East Asia, white is similarly associated with mourning; it represented the purity and perfection of the deceased person's spirit. During the Victorian era, purple and grey were considered to be mourning colors in addition to black. Furthermore, in Revelation 6 in The Bible, Death is one of the four horsemen; and he rides a pale horse.

See also

References

External links
 An analysis of symbols of Death on the tombstones of the Knights of the Order of St John at the St John's Co-Cathedral at Valletta, Malta, as appearing in Dane Munro, 'Memento Mori, a companion to the most beautiful floor in the world' (Malta, 2005), 2 vols. .

Cultural aspects of death
Symbols